is a Japanese voice actress and narrator from Nagano Prefecture. She is affiliated with Aoni Production. Some of her major roles are Rem in Death Note, Sister in Eden of the East, Chieko in Princess Jellyfish, Hiroko in Blue Drop and Big Madam in Tokyo Ghoul.

Filmography

Television animation
One Piece (1999), Gyoro, Boa Marigold, Catarina Devon, Acilia, Uhoricia, Charlotte Mondee
Ultimate Muscle: The Kinnikuman Legacy (2002), Helga, Suzy
Area 88 (2004), Alicia
Kyo Kara Maoh! (2004), Tzo
Tweeny Witches, Biris
Basilisk: The Kouga Ninja Scrolls (2005), Ofuku/Lady Kasuga
Ayakashi (2006), Obi
Yu-Gi-Oh! 5D's (2008), Martha
Welcome to the N.H.K. (2006), Misaki's Aunt
Death Note (2006), Rem
Kekkaishi (2006), Fuzuki
Blue Drop: Tenshitachi no Gikyoku (2007), Hiroko Funatsumaru
Higashi no Eden (2009), Sis
Seikon no Qwaser (2010), Big Ma'am
Bakugan: Gundalian Invaders (2010), Kazarina, Avior – Japanese dub
Kuragehime (2010), Chieko
The Devil Is a Part-Timer! (2013), Marie
Tokyo Ghoul (2015), Big Madam
Garo: Guren no Tsuki (2015), Suetsumuhana
One-Punch Man (2015), Madame Shibabawa
Dimension W (2016), Marie
Mobile Suit Gundam: Iron-Blooded Orphans (2016), Arium Gyojan
Overlord II (2018), Gagaran
Skull-face Bookseller Honda-san (2018), Lantern
BNA: Brand New Animal (2020), Melissa Horner
Golden Kamuy (2020), Sofia
Wandering Witch: The Journey of Elaina (2020), (Former) Yaeba
Insect Land (2022), Rafael
Made in Abyss: The Golden City of the Scorching Sun (2022), Muugi

Original net animation
Japan Sinks: 2020 (2020), Kirishima (ep. 6)
The Way of the Househusband (2021), President

Original video animation
Nana to Kaoru (2011) (Waka Sugimura)
UQ Holder! OVA (2017) (Dana Ananga Jagannatha)

Theatrical animation
Hunter × Hunter: The Last Mission (2013) (Milluki Zoldyck)

Tokusatsu
Shuriken Sentai Ninninger (2015) (Yokai Yuki-onna)
Kamen Rider Saber (2020) (Medusa Megid)

Video games
Tales of Symphonia (2003) (uncredited)
Soulcalibur III (2005) (Woman, Aurelia Dichalha Dolce Dalkia)
Rune Factory Frontier (2008) (Stella)
Yakuza 3 (2009) (Mitsuo)
Super Smash Bros. Ultimate (2018) (Mii Fighters)
The Legend of Heroes: Kuro no Kiseki II – Crimson Sin (2022) (Dominique Ranster)
Hi-Fi Rush (2023) (Rekka)

Dubbing roles

Live-action
And Just Like That... (Che Diaz (Sara Ramirez))
Annie (Annie's "Mom" (Tracie Thoms))
Breakthrough (Joyce Smith (Chrissy Metz))
Bridesmaids (Megan Price (Melissa McCarthy))
City on a Hill (Grace Campbell (Pernell Walker))
Coming 2 America (Mary Junson (Leslie Jones))
Criminal Minds (Penelope Garcia (Kirsten Vangsness))
Criminal Minds: Suspect Behavior (Penelope Garcia (Kirsten Vangsness))
The Darkest Minds (Lady Jane (Gwendoline Christie))
The Dictator (Denise (Jessica St. Clair))
Ender's Game (Major Gwen Anderson (Viola Davis))
Get Smart (2011 TV Asahi edition) (Max's Dance Partner (Lindsay Hollister))
Godzilla: King of the Monsters (Colonel Diane Foster (Aisha Hinds))
The Heat (Detective Shannon Mullins (Melissa McCarthy))
Jojo Rabbit (Fräulein Rahm (Rebel Wilson))
The Karate Kid (Sherry Parker (Taraji P. Henson))
The Kitchen (Kathy Brennan (Melissa McCarthy))
Nobody's Fool (Tanya (Tiffany Haddish))
Peacemaker (Leota Adebayo (Danielle Brooks))
Ready Player One (Helen Harris / Aech (Lena Waithe))
The Sisterhood of the Traveling Pants (Carmen Lowell (America Ferrera))
The Sisterhood of the Traveling Pants 2 (Carmen Lowell (America Ferrera))
Spell (Veora Woods (Lorraine Burroughs))
Star Wars: The Force Awakens (Captain Phasma (Gwendoline Christie))
Venom (Dr. Rosie Collins (Sope Aluko))
Watchmen (Angela Abar / Sister Night (Regina King))
Zack Snyder's Justice League (Philippus (Ann Ogbomo))

Animation
The Bad Guys (Police Chief Misty Luggins)
Fly Me to the Moon (Scooter)
The Lego Movie 2: The Second Part (Queen Watevra Wa'Nabi)
Onward (Specter)
ParaNorman (Alvin)
Shrek Forever After (Georgette)
Star Wars Resistance (Captain Phasma)

References

External links
 Official agency profile 
 Kimiko Saitō at GamePlaza-Haruka Voice Acting Database 
 

1977 births
Living people
Voice actresses from Nagano Prefecture
Japanese voice actresses
Japanese video game actresses
Aoni Production voice actors
21st-century Japanese actresses